Herman Brosius (1851 - 1917) was an American cartographer who made panoramic maps that were printed at his twin brother Frederick Brosius' firm in Milwaukee, Wisconsin. His work is held in the collection of the Library and Archives Canada, Brock University, and the Museum of Wisconsin Art.

Brosius was born in Milwaukee, Wisconsin. His twin brother Frederick owned the Milwaukee Lithograph and Engraving Company and the brothers collaborated to produce dozens of panoramic maps. Brosius produced several views of Texas municipalities beginning with Jefferson, Texas in 1872

His earliest map was of Darlington, Wisconsin. During his career.he also produced views of Canadian cities including Ontario and Ottawa.

Brosius died in Milwaulkee.

Gallery

References

1851 births
American cartographers
1917 deaths
Businesspeople from Milwaukee
American twins
19th-century cartographers
19th-century American businesspeople